Charles Sneddon (10 June 1930 – 1992) was a Scottish professional footballer who played as a centre half.

Career
Born in Bo'ness, Sneddon played for Forth Wanderers, Stenhousemuir, Accrington Stanley and Padiham.

References

1930 births
1992 deaths
Scottish footballers
Forth Wanderers F.C. players
Stenhousemuir F.C. players
Accrington Stanley F.C. (1891) players
Padiham F.C. players
Scottish Football League players
English Football League players
Association football defenders